Blon is an agrotown in Puchavičy District, Minsk Region, Belarus.

History
It is associated with Jesuit priest and poet Józef Baka, who established  there a Jesuit monastery in about 1745 and a wooden church of John the Baptist around 1748. In 1863 they were sequestrated as a punishment for taking part in the January Uprising and in 1868 they were sold to a civil official  Bończ-Osmołowski (Иосиф Александрович Бонч-Осмоловский), from which lands the properties of  włościans (:pl:włościanin, a land-owning peasant) were separated, leaving about 2250 morgen of arable land.

References

Agrotowns in Belarus
Populated places in Puchavičy District